The 2012 AMA National Speedway Championship Series was staged over a single round, which was held at Auburn on September 28. Billy Hamill took the title, his fifth in total, dropping just one point in his opening ride.

Event format 
Over the course of 20 heats, each rider raced against every other rider once. The top eight scorers then reached the semi-finals, with first and second in those semi-finals reaching the final. The final positions were decided upon the placing in that final.

Classification 
28 September 2012
 Auburn

References 

AMA
AMA National
AMA National Speedway Championship
AMA National Speedway Championship 
AMA National Speedway Championship